Samrat is a 1997 Tamil language crime thriller film directed by Sakthi Chidambaram (credited as C.Dinakaran) as his first film as a director. The film stars Ramki, Vineetha, and newcomer Rukma, with Mohan Natarajan, R. Sundarrajan, Thalaivasal Vijay, Sabitha Anand, Vasuki, Rajasekhar, and Veera Pandiyan playing supporting roles. The film, produced by Lakshmi Karan, had music by Manoj Saran and cinematography by S. Rajasekaran. The film released on 10 October 1997. The film is remake of the Hindi film Baazigar, which was based on the novel A Kiss Before Dying written by Ira Levin. The film became a failure at the box-office.

Plot

A young man (Ramki) comes in a remote village in Pollachi. He claims to be Ashok and to be reported missing when he was a kid. His sister Arukkani (Vasuki) and his brother-in-law (R. Sundarrajan) accommodate him in their house. There, Ashok meets Damayanthi (Rukma), the daughter of Sundar (Mohan Natarajan), the wealthiest man in the village. They fall in love with each other. When Sundar arranges Damayanthi's wedding with a rich bride, Ashok is heart-broken. The couples decide to get secretly married in a small temple far from the village. After tying the thaali around Damayanthi's neck, he removes himself from the knot. Damayanthi runs away crying. The entire scene is recorded by a hidden camera, and Ashok then sends the videotape of the scene to Sundar. Ashok then vanishes from the village and starts to blackmail Sundar.

Ashok now lives in the city and tries to repeatedly woo the city girl Chandramukhi (Vineetha) under the name of Samrat. Chandramukhi is studying in the city, and she finally falls in love with him. She also succeeds in passing the IPS exams and eventually becomes a police inspector. Chandramukhi is tasked with a tricky mission: to investigate the disappearance of Damayanthi. Damayanthi is none other than Chandramukhi's elder sister.

Damayanthi is later found by her father Sundar. However, she is not like as before: she became a mentally disabled person. Sundar explains to Chandramukhi what happened in the past to Damayanthi. Sundar tried to do everything to find Ashok but could not find him. Chandramukhi and her father send Damayanthi in a mental hospital. Chandramukhi continues her investigation with Inspector Kalidas (Veera Pandiyan), but without much success. In the meantime, Samrat covers one's tracks. He even kills Damayanthi and the hospital doctor Ilyas (Rajasekhar), who witnessed Damayanthi's murder. Samrat finally reveals to Chandramukhi the reason behind his acts. In the past, Sundar killed Samrat's innocent father (Thalaivasal Vijay) and removed the thaali from his mother's (Sabitha Anand) neck. Sundar later lied to the villagers that he had an affair with Samrat's mother, and she also died.

Samrat is a psychopath who wants to take revenge on Sundar at any cost as he believes that his late mother is still alive. Samrat also wants to impose Chandramukhi the same fate as Damayanthi. What transpires later forms the crux of the story.

Cast

Ramki as Samrat / Ashok
Vineetha as Chandramukhi
Rukma as Damayanthi
Mohan Natarajan as Sundar
R. Sundarrajan
Thalaivasal Vijay as Samrat's father
Sabitha Anand as Samrat's mother
Vasuki as Arukkani
Rajasekhar as Doctor Ilyas
Veera Pandiyan as Inspector Kalidas
M. R. Krishnamurthy
Vichithra
Jyothi Meena
K. Prabhakaran
Chitraguptan
John Babu
Karuppu Subbiah
Ashwin Kumar

Soundtrack

The film score and the soundtrack were composed by Manoj Saran. The soundtrack, released in 1997, features 5 tracks with lyrics written by Muthulingam, Piraisoodan and C. Dhinakaran.

References

External links

1997 films
1990s Tamil-language films
Indian romantic thriller films
Indian crime thriller films
1997 crime thriller films
Films based on American novels
Films based on thriller novels
Films based on works by Ira Levin
Indian films about revenge
Tamil remakes of Hindi films
1990s romantic thriller films
Films directed by Sakthi Chidambaram